Phillip Ray Pickett, Jr. is a Republican member of the North Carolina House of Representatives representing the 93rd district (based in Ashe and Watauga counties) since 2021. He defeated incumbent Democrat Carl Ray Russell in the 2020 election.

Electoral history

Committee assignments

2021-2022 session
Appropriations
Appropriations: Capital
Education: Universities - Vice Chair
Families, Children, and Aging
Transportation - Vice Chair

References

Living people
Republican Party members of the North Carolina House of Representatives
21st-century American politicians
Year of birth missing (living people)